Gabriel Barletta or Gabriele da Barletta (Barletta, Italy, 15th century) was a Catholic preacher of the Dominican Order, whose sermons were widely published in Italy after his death. 

Used across Italy, Barletta's sermons became synonymous with preaching: Nescit praedicare qui nescit barlettare (He who knows how to preach, knows how to "Barletta").

His sermons appeared in two volumes at Brixen in 1497, and have been reprinted very frequently since. Echard says that no less than thirteen editions appeared in eighty years. The best edition is that of Venice (1577), in two volumes.

In form his sermons are nothing else than the ordinary homily on the virtues and vices of life. He spares none of the foibles and weaknesses of his contemporaries, and in his denunciations passages of eloquent and biting sarcasm are often met with. At times he descends to an almost burlesque mimicry, as witness his sermon on the manner in which the rich ecclesiastic says the Lord's prayer. Coarse things are also to be found, but not so frequently as in the printed sermons of some of his rivals. He has been blamed for this coarseness by Bayle and Theophilus Raynaud, but his name has been completely vindicated by Dominic Casales, O.P., in the work "Candor lilii seu Ordo Praedicatorum a calumniis Petri a Valle Clausa [i.e. Theop. Reynaldi] vindicatus". Some maintain (Tubing, Quartalschrift, 1872, II, 270) that Barletta is not the author of the sermons which bear his name. They base their contention on a sentence of Leander Alberti [Descrizzione di tutta Italia (Bologna, 1550), 200], who says that an unskilled youth whom he knew gathered together old and unknown sermons and ascribed them to Barletta. Furthermore, they must have appeared in the vernacular, whilst we know them in the Latin alone. Thus they have suffered many changes and alterations. But up to the seventeenth century there was no question of the authorship. They show sure signs of the times and are not unworthy of his fame. Hence, scholars generally accept them as authentic.

His best works:
 Sermones quadragesimales et de sanctis (Holy Lenten Sermons)
 Tabula super Bibliam (Overview of the Bible)
 Votum de libro De divina praeordinatione vitae et mortis humanae (An Invocation of the Book: On the Divine Predetermination of Human Life and Death)

References

15th-century Neapolitan people
Italian Dominicans